Dynein heavy chain 9, axonemal is a protein that in humans is encoded by the DNAH9 gene.

This gene encodes the heavy chain subunit of axonemal dynein, a large multi-subunit molecular motor. Axonemal dynein attaches to microtubules and hydrolyzes ATP to mediate the movement of cilia and flagella. The gene expresses at least two transcript variants; additional variants have been described, but their full length nature has not been determined.

References

Further reading